Baldwin Vista is a  neighborhood located next to the Baldwin Hills Mountains in the South region of the city of Los Angeles, California. It is located in the western Baldwin Hills, and partially borders on Culver City.

Geography 

The Baldwin Vista neighborhood is bounded by La Cienega Boulevard to the west, La Brea Avenue to the east, Coliseum Street to the north, and Kenneth Hahn Park to the south.

Notable people 
Karen Bass, the U.S. representative for California's 33rd congressional district, lives in Baldwin Vista.

See also 
 List of districts and neighborhoods in Los Angeles

References

External links 

 Leimert Park Beat is a collaborative online community focused on the area around Leimert Park: The Soul of Los Angeles and the African American cultural center of the city.

Baldwin Hills (mountain range)
Neighborhoods in Los Angeles
Baldwin Hills, Los Angeles
South Los Angeles